Santa Margherita d'Adige was a comune (municipality) in the Province of Padua in the Italian region Veneto, located about  southwest of Venice and about  southwest of Padua.

Santa Margherita d'Adige bordered the following former and current municipalities: Megliadino San Fidenzio (former), Megliadino San Vitale, Ospedaletto Euganeo, Piacenza d'Adige, Ponso, Saletto (former).

Since 17 February 2018 Santa Margherita d'Adige is part of Borgo Veneto municipality.

Demographic evolution

References

External links

Cities and towns in Veneto